M. Reza Ghadiri is an Iranian-American chemist who studies nanoscale science and technology.

Ghadiri holds a Ph.D. degree in chemistry (1987) from the University of Wisconsin–Madison. He is currently a Professor of chemistry at The Scripps Research Institute.

The 1998 Feynman Prize was awarded to Ghadiri for  work in constructing molecular structures through the use of self-organization. His lab also pioneered the development of peptide self-replication.

Awards 
Searle Scholars Award 1991-1994;
Arnold & Mabel Beckman Foundation, Beckman Young Investigators Award, 1991-1993;
Alfred P. Sloan Research Fellow 1993-1995;
Eli Lilly Grantee 1994-1995;
ACS Award in Pure Chemistry 1995;
Arthur C. Cope Scholar Award, American Chemical Society 1999;
Feynman Prize in Nanotechnology 1998;
Merck-Frosst Lecturer, University of Victoria, British Columbia 2001;
Belleau Lecturer, McGill University, Montreal, Quebec 2001.

See also 
Iranian science

References

External links
Faculty profile at The Scripps Research Institute

Iranian chemists
 University of Wisconsin–Madison College of Letters and Science alumni
American people of Iranian descent
Living people
Scripps Research faculty
Year of birth missing (living people)